Midnight Runaround is a 1994 American made-for-television film, and the second in a series of television films produced for Universal Television's Action Pack programming block and based on the 1988 film Midnight Run. The sequel to Another Midnight Run, the film stars Christopher McDonald reprising his role as Jack Walsh. Midnight Runaround was followed by Midnight Run for Your Life.

Cast

 Christopher McDonald as Jack Walsh
 Kyle Secor as Dale Adder
 Ed O'Ross as Marvin Dorfler
 John Fleck as Jerry Geisler
 Dan Hedaya as Eddie Moscone
 Rebecca Cross as Gina
 Tom McCleister as Hal Mooney
 Dick Miller as O'Doul
 Leon Russom as Sheriff Burton
 Beverly Leech as Reba
 Jeff Doucette as Orvis 
 Gary Grubbs as Lester

Filming locations
Los Angeles, California 
Sperry, Oklahoma

References

External links

1994 television films
1994 films
Action Pack (TV programming block)
American television films
Universal Pictures films
American action comedy films
Films shot in Oklahoma
Films set in Oklahoma
Films shot in Los Angeles
Television sequel films
1990s American films